Phyllotreta undulata, known generally as the small striped flea beetle or turnip flea beetle, is a species of flea beetle in the family Chrysomelidae. It is found in Australia, Europe and Northern Asia (excluding China), North America, and Oceania.

References

Further reading

External links

 

Alticini
Beetles described in 1860